Edmore Dube (born 5 October 1975) is a retired Zimbabwean football striker.

References

1975 births
Living people
Zimbabwean footballers
Zimbabwe international footballers
Highlanders F.C. players
Black Rhinos F.C. players
Association football forwards